North Express (Finnish: Pikajuna pohjoiseen) is a 1947 Finnish thriller film directed by Roland af Hällström and starring Ansa Ikonen, Leif Wager and Tauno Majuri. The film was produced in parallel with a Swedish language version Tåg norrut which starred different actors and was directed by Palle Hagmann.

Cast
 Ansa Ikonen as Maire Kyrö  
 Leif Wager as Reino Sompa  
 Tauno Majuri as Mauno Ismola  
 Aku Korhonen as Hugo Auvonen  
 Arna Högdahl as Counsellor's wife 
 Sven Relander as Fjalar Albert Lindström  
 Eino Kaipainen as Kaarlo Kyrö  
 Liisa Tuomi as Ilona Viirola  
 Anja Kola as Raili Oras  
 Tapio Nurkka as Kalevi Oras  
 Arvi Tuomi as Major of the Salvation Army  
 Kalle Viherpuu as Harras  
 Unto Salminen as Ahvo  
 Emil Vinermo as Kaukomieli Lemmitty Latvanen  
 Aku Peltonen as Ossi Lintunen  
 Eero Leväluoma as Saarros  
 Atos Konst as Siltanen  
 Eva Hemming as Salvationist  
 Varma Lahtinen as Loviisa  
 Lulu Paasipuro as Impi Lintunen  
 Matti Aulos as Train conductor 
 Teijo Joutsela as Loppi  
 Elsa Nyström as Raili's mother  
 Lauri Korpela as Raili's father  
 Aatu Talanne as Doctor  
 Lauri Kyöstilä as Station man in Perämaa 
 Mauri Jaakkola as Lauri Aalto

References

Bibliography 
 Pietari Kääpä. Directory of World Cinema: Finland. Intellect Books, 2012.

External links 
 

1947 films
1940s thriller films
1940s Finnish-language films
Films directed by Roland af Hällström
Finnish thriller films
Finnish black-and-white films